Ider is a town in DeKalb County, Alabama, United States. At the 2020 census, the population was 735. It incorporated in October 1973.

Geography
Ider is located at  (34.703941, -85.673983). The town is situated atop Sand Mountain, a few miles west of the Alabama-Georgia state line. Alabama State Route 75 and Alabama State Route 117 intersect in Ider.

Major highways
 State Route 75
 State Route 117

Demographics

As of the 2010 census Ider had a population of 723.  The racial and ethnic composition of the population was 93.2% non-Hispanic white, 0.6% black or African American, 4.0% Native American, 0.1% some other race, 2.1% from two or more races and 0.1% Hispanic or Latino or any race.

As of the census of 2000, there were 664 people, 282 households, and 192 families residing in the town. The population density was 122.2 people per square mile (47.2/km2). The racial makeup of the town was 96.39% White, 0.00% Black, 1.20% Native American, 0.45% from other races, and 1.96% from two or more races. 0.60% of the population were Hispanic or Latino of any race.

There were 282 households, out of which 28.7% had children under the age of 18 living with them, 56.4% were married couples living together, 7.4% had a female householder with no husband present, and 31.9% were non-families. 29.4% of all households were made up of individuals, and 13.1% had someone living alone who was 65 years of age or older. The average household size was 2.35 and the average family size was 2.91.

In the town, the population was spread out, with 23.5% under the age of 18, 6.5% from 18 to 24, 29.5% from 25 to 44, 24.4% from 45 to 64, and 16.1% who were 65 years of age or older. The median age was 39 years. For every 100 females, there were 96.4 males. For every 100 females age 18 and over, there were 94.6 males.

The median income for a household in the town was $27,563, and the median income for a family was $36,146. Males had a median income of $30,139 versus $21,875 for females. The per capita income for the town was $15,040. About 13.6% of families and 19.7% of the population were below the poverty line, including 18.5% of those under age 18 and 18.6% of those age 65 or over.

Climate

Education

School
Ider High School, which is a member of the DeKalb County School System.

Library

Ider Public Library - Located at 10808 AL HWY 75
The Ider Homemakers Club came up with the idea of creating a community library around 1994. The Ider City Council liked the idea and they facilitated the successful applications for county and state grants for funding the creation and operation of the new community facility. The regulations stated that someone with a degree in Library Science had to set up the library.  Mrs. Virginia York had such a degree and volunteered many hours to organizing the library. Mrs. Virginia Adams was the first librarian. (Source of information:  Louise S. Berry, Flat Rock, AL 2009)

Culture and tourism

Festivals
Ider annually holds a festival known as Mule Day.  This festival is held on Labor Day each year.  Mule Day activities include horse and mule pulls, an antique tractor and car show, food, arts and crafts, gospel singing, and children's games. Canceled as of 2017

Parades
Ider hosts three annual parades.
 The Mule Day Parade takes place in September on Labor Day and coincides with the Mule Day festivities.  Various community and Ider School organizations participate in the parade. Canceled as of 2017
 The Homecoming Parade usually takes place during the month of October.  This parade kicks off celebrations centered on Ider High School's Homecoming football game.
 The Christmas Parade takes place every year in December. The Ider High School Band is part of the parade.

Attractions
Ider Town Park which hosts Mule Day has a lighted walking trail, a picnic area, tennis courts, baseball fields, a playground, and a stage.

Notable person
Todd Greeson, member of the Alabama House of Representatives since 1998

References

External links
 

Towns in DeKalb County, Alabama
Towns in Alabama